Lust in Space is the eleventh studio album by Gwar. It was released on August 18, 2009. It is their first album since returning to their old label Metal Blade Records. The album also saw the return of their former bassist Casey Orr, even though he would later part ways with the band yet again. Lust in Space debuted at #96 on the Billboard top 200 Charts and according to Blabbermouth it was Gwar's highest position reached for the debut of an album.

The cover is an homage/parody of the Kiss album Love Gun.

Overview
This time around, Gwar manages to steal a Scumdog ship and prepares to finally leave Earth; however, Cardinal Syn returns and plans an attack. Gwar then seeks the help of Zog, an old Scumdog commander who trained Oderus, to help them. However, it turns out that he's become nothing but old and homeless. Gwar eventually sets everything straight and leave Earth, promising to stop on tour, and keep us all up to date on their activities.

The album also introduces a new Destructo, Sawborg, who wields a sawblade arm and has another sawblade sticking out of his head. He is not mentioned on the album, except briefly in "Gwarnography".

In an interview with Ultimate-Guitar, Cory Smoot (Flattus Maximus) revealed that he played all the instruments on "Release the Flies", as it was originally a song he wrote for his solo project.

Track listing

Personnel
Dave Brockie (Oderus Urungus) - lead vocals
Cory Smoot (Flattus Maximus) - lead guitar, backing vocals, lead vocals on "Release the Flies"
Mike Derks (Balsac the Jaws of Death) - rhythm guitar, backing vocals
Casey Orr (Beefcake the Mighty) - bass, backing vocals, lead vocals on "The Price of Peace"
Brad Roberts (Jizmak Da Gusha) - drums, percussion

References

2009 albums
Gwar albums
Metal Blade Records albums
Albums with cover art by Eliran Kantor